Get 'Em Up may refer to:
Get 'Em Up (Nickelback song), 2014 song from album No Fixed Address
"Get 'Em Up", song from Rise Up 2010 album by Cypress Hill